Radara is a genus of moths of the family Erebidae. The genus was erected by Francis Walker in 1862.

Species
Radara helcida (Viette, 1961) Madagascar
Radara infundens (Walker, [1863]) Borneo
Radara prunescens (Hampson, 1902) southern Africa
Radara subcupralis (Walker, [1866]) southern and western Africa to India
Radara thermeola Hampson, 1926 southern Africa
Radara vacillans Walker, 1862 southern Africa

Former species
 Radara anartoides is now known as Cecharismena anartoides (Walker, 1865)

References

Calpinae
Heteroneura genera